Mrs. Osburn House is a historic home in Durham, Greene County, New York. It was built about 1850 and is a five-by-three-bay timber frame dwelling. It features clapboard siding and a low-pitched hipped roof. Also on the property is a heavy-timber-frame barn.

It was listed on the National Register of Historic Places in 2001.

References

Houses on the National Register of Historic Places in New York (state)
Houses completed in 1850
Houses in Greene County, New York
National Register of Historic Places in Greene County, New York